The 1995 Shali cluster bomb attack was an attack which occurred on 3 January 1995, when Russian fighter-jets bombed the Chechen town of Shali with cluster bombs.

Events
Eighteen cluster bombs were reportedly dropped in and around Shali on that day in several runs. The bombs hit a roadside market first, followed by a gas station, and a hospital, in which civilians, as well as Russian prisoners of war, were being treated. The aircraft then went on to strafe a Muslim cemetery. A school and a collective farm were also targeted.

At least 55 people were killed (including five medical workers), and 186 people were wounded. An estimate by the Russian presidential human rights office put the number of killed at over 100. No military targets were reported in the area at the time of the attack.

Yeltsin's office announced a halt to air raids on Grozny, but the statement did not rule out the use of heavy artillery, which caused damage to civilian targets. The military's tactics raised concerns over civilian casualties, causing protests in Russia and drawing criticism from Western governments.

References

External links
 Czeczenka opowiedziała straszną historię, Dziennik Polska-Europa-Świat, September 17, 2007

Conflicts in 1995
Shali cluster bomb attack
Shali cluster bomb attack
War crimes of the First Chechen War